The Yakovlev Yak-30 (NATO reporting name Magnum), originally designated Yakovlev 104, was Yakovlev's entry in a competition for the first military jet trainer aircraft designed for Warsaw Pact nations. Designed to succeed the Yak-17UTI, it also led to the development of the Yakovlev Yak-32 sport jet. The Yak-30 lost to the L-29 Delfin, and neither it nor the Yak-32 entered production.

Design and development
In 1959 the Soviet Air Force held a competition for the first purpose-built jet trainer to enter service with the Soviet Union and Warsaw Pact nations. Prior to this, all Soviet jet trainers, such as the Yakovlev Yak-17UTI, had been modified from existing jet fighters. Since Yakovlev had produced most of the Soviet Union's trainer aircraft since World War II, winning the competition was extremely important, as the winner would be produced extensively for many years. Yakovlev's entry in the competition was the Yak-30. Surprisingly, it was the only competitor from within the Soviet Union.

The Yak-30 was an all-metal aircraft made entirely from light alloys. It was designed to be easy and inexpensive to build, the two wing spars being made from pressed-sheet ribs. The simple, elliptical fuselage housed the pupil and instructor in a single unpressurized tandem cockpit. Fuel was limited to 600 liters (132 gallons) in a bag tank located in the fuselage above the wing.

The engine was the Turmanskii-designed RU-19, made especially for the aircraft. Like the rest of the aircraft, it was simply designed, a single-shaft turbojet with a seven-stage axial compressor, rated at 900 kg (1,984 lbs) thrust. Air was fed from very small inlets located in the wing roots, and discharged directly under the rear fuselage with no jetpipe. To ease servicing, the engine could be lowered straight down without disturbing the fuselage.

The tailplane was fixed halfway up the sharply-swept fin, and all control surfaces were manually driven by rods which ran down a dorsal spine extending along the upper surface of the aircraft, ending at the rear of the canopy. The long, continuous canopy was of blown Plexiglas, and bulged to give a better downward view. It slid to the rear on long rails. The ejection seats could both be fired by the instructor, while the pupil could fire only his own seat. Both cockpit positions had a complete set of controls.

The tricycle undercarriage was retractable. The main units retracted inward, while the steerable nosewheel retracted forwards into a bay covered by two doors. Though provisions were made for armament similar to the military version of the single-seat Yakovlev Yak-32, no armament was placed on the four prototypes.

The technical manager on the program was K V Sinelshcikov. Chief engineers were V A Shavrin, V G Tsvelov and V P Vlasov.

Operational history
The OKB built a single static/fatigue test airframe, as well as four flying prototypes (callsigns 30, 50, 80 and 90). Two Yak-32's were also assembled at the same time. 

Factory testing took place from 20 May 1960 through March 1961. A total of 82 flights were made with 43 hours 36 minutes of flight time. No difficulties in operating the aircraft were found.
The competition ultimately came down to three aircraft, the rivals being the Czechoslovak L-29 Delfin, and the Polish TS-11 Iskra. The Iskra was quickly eliminated and sent back to Poland, leaving the Yak-30 in a head-to-head competition with the L-29, in which the Yak design showed far better performance, including lower weight, better maneuverability and lower production costs. However, in the end, a political decision was reached to select the more robust Czechoslovak L-29 in August 1961 to serve as the primary jet trainer for all Soviet and Warsaw Pact nations except for Poland. Immediately after this decision OKB pilot Smirnov set several official light jet world records in the Yak-30.
These included speed over a 25 kilometer course  (767.308 km/h), and maximum altitude of 16,128 meters.
One of the surviving prototypes is on display at the Central Air Force Museum, at Monino, outside of Moscow.

Operators

Soviet Air Force

Specifications (Yak-30)

See also

References

Further reading
 
 
 Simakov, Boris, "Soviet planes. 1917–1970"

External links

Aero-concept.com
Ctrl-c.liu.se
Airwar.ru (RU)
Yak-30 Walkaround

1960s Soviet military trainer aircraft
Yak-030 1960
Abandoned military aircraft projects of the Soviet Union
Low-wing aircraft
Single-engined jet aircraft
Aircraft first flown in 1960